The 2008 Peace Queen Cup was the second edition of the Peace Queen Cup. It was held from 14 to 21 June 2008 in Suwon, South Korea.

Venues

Group stage
All times are Korean Standard Time (KST) – UTC+9

Group A

Group B

Final

Awards

Winners

Individual awards

Scorers
5 goals
 Christine Sinclair

3 goals

 Heather Garriock
 Abby Wambach

2 goals
 Kara Lang

1 goal

 Amy Chapman
 Kyah Simon
 Érika
 Maurine
 Diana Matheson
 Melissa Tancredi
 Brittany Timko
 Tatiana Zorri
 Cha Yun-Hee
 Jeon Ga-Eul
 Kim Su-Yeon
 Kwon Ha-Neul
 Park Hee-young
 Amber Hearn
 Kirsty Yallop
 Natasha Kai
 Amy Rodriguez

External links
 2008 Peace Queen Cup 
 2008 Peace Queen Cup in RSSSF.com

2008
Sports competitions in Suwon
2008 in women's association football
2008 in South Korean football
2008 in American women's soccer
2008 in Canadian women's soccer
2007–08 in Italian women's football
2007–08 in Australian women's soccer
2008 in Brazilian women's football
2007–08 in Argentine football
2007–08 in New Zealand association football